Palette is the fourth studio album by South Korean singer-songwriter IU. It was released on April 21, 2017, by LOEN Entertainment under its imprint FAVE Entertainment. Palette is IU's first album since Chat-Shire (2015), and her first full-length release since Modern Times (2013).

The album was successful both commercially and critically. It spawned three singles; "Through the Night" was released as the album's lead single on March 24, followed by "Can't Love You Anymore" on April 7, and the title track, "Palette", released on April 21. All three singles of the album hit number one on South Korean Gaon Chart.

Billboard magazine listed the album at number one on its list of "Best K-Pop Albums of 2017". The album earned IU a Melon Music Award for Album of the Year, and a nomination for Artist of the Year and won Record of the Year (Album) in the 27th Seoul Music Awards. Palette also won "Best Pop Album" award at the 15th Korean Music Awards.

Title and artwork

While IU's previous album, Chat-Shire, deliberated the confusion and anxieties of a twenty-three year old, Palette offers the perspective of someone at a more mature stage in life. A body of work that tells the story of self-actualization, the album reads similarly to the final chapters of a bildungsroman where the main character embraces adulthood. In a Naver V-Live, IU stated that:

As such, Palette can be taken to refer to the various people in life that one comes across, and their different aspects—appreciating them in a celebratory way. It also refers to the flaws, the accomplishments and the feelings of oneself—and how despite their various "colors" on a palette, they are a work of art all in their own right. This is mentioned in her JTBC interview, where she explains that despite talking about herself, she is also talking about people in general.

The shooting for the album jacket was an extensive process, with IU stating that she had "15 sets" of clothing in one day of shooting. For some of the photos, IU decided to have her in similar poses and shots were taken to that of her previous album Last Fantasy, to highlight the differences in maturity that have developed. Mok Jungwook was the main photographer for the album jacket. He also worked on her previous albums Modern Times and Chat-Shire. Longtime stylist Noh Juhee was also involved, as well as hair stylist Seo Yun, and makeup artist Shin Ae—all of whom have worked with IU since her debut.

Reception

Palette received mostly positive reviews from critics. Billboards Jeff Benjamin wrote, "Since her 2008 debut EP Lost and Found that was fully written and composed by hit producers, IU has been on a gradual mission to taking full artistic control of her music. Plus, Palette is proving to be not only a creative accomplishment with it almost entirely written by the young star, but a body of work that reveals what's going on in her head and has rewarded her with new levels of success." Later, the album topped Billboards "20 Best K-Pop Albums 2017" list. Billboard branded the album "the year's shining example of the power in personal K-pop with a release that employed loads of different sounds and stories to share insight about the star beneath the gorgeous gowns and pristine makeup", and furthermore praises IU for "showcas[ing] the moments of self-doubt, worry and gloom, and then explain[ing] them in the music styles and genres she sees most appropriate." Fuse also listed Palette at number 9 on their list of the "20 Best Albums of 2017", becoming the only Korean release to make the list, and praising her stunning album as making a "major case for the power of personal K-pop". In a review for The 405, Chase McMullen declared, "...the best moments here are when she unburdens the music of others, and simply allows her quest for self-actualization to shine through. This is very much an album of a young adult finding herself, former doubts cast aside for a newfound comfort."

Track listing

Charts

Weekly charts

Sales

Accolades

Release history

References

External links

2017 albums
IU (singer) albums
Korean-language albums
Kakao M albums